Ho Tin, named after nearby Ho Tin Street, is an at-grade MTR Light Rail stop located at Kin Fung Circuit, opposite to Tuen Mun River and Tuen Mun station in Tuen Mun District. It began service on 18 September 1988 and belongs to Zone 2. It serves the nearby industrial area.

See also
Light Rail (MTR)
Tuen Mun District
Tuen Mun
Tuen Mun stop (preceding stop), which is an interchange station for the West Rail line as well.
Choy Yee Bridge stop (following stop)
Tuen Mun River

References

MTR Light Rail stops
Former Kowloon–Canton Railway stations
Tuen Mun District
Railway stations in Hong Kong opened in 1988